{{DISPLAYTITLE:C18H24I3N3O8}}
The molecular formula C18H24I3N3O8 (molar mass: 791.112 g/mol, exact mass: 790.8698 u) may refer to:

 Iopromide
 Ioxilan